Nicotiana africana is a species of plant in the family Solanaceae. It is endemic to Namibia.  Its natural habitats are subtropical or tropical dry shrubland and rocky areas.

References

Endemic flora of Namibia
africana
Least concern plants
Taxonomy articles created by Polbot